Peter Joseph Lang (born 19 November 1950) is a Canadian politician and former Liberal party member of the House of Commons of Canada. He was a physician, psychiatrist and coroner by career.

Born in Kitchener, Ontario, Lang was elected to Ontario's Kitchener riding in the 1980 federal election and served in the 32nd Canadian Parliament. He was defeated in the 1984 election by John Reimer of the Progressive Conservative party.

External links
 

1950 births
Liberal Party of Canada MPs
Living people
Members of the House of Commons of Canada from Ontario
Politicians from Kitchener, Ontario
Canadian coroners